The 1995 Fangoria Chainsaw Awards ceremony, presented by Fangoria magazine and Creation Entertainment, honored the best horror films of 1994 and took place on May 6, 1995, at the LAX Sheraton in Los Angeles, California. The ceremony was hosted by comedians Rick Overton and Scott LaRose.

Ceremony
The event was held as part of Fangoria's annual Weekend of Horrors convention, in partnership with Creation Entertainment. Attendees at the convention included Clive Barker, John Carl Buechler, Don Coscarelli, Barbara Crampton, Brad Dourif, Stuart Gordon, Steve Johnson, John Saxon, David J. Schow, George P. Wilbur.

Presenters
Screaming Mad George - presenter for Best Soundtrack
Brinke Stevens and Vernon Wells - presenters for Best Supporting Actor and Best Supporting Actress
Cyris Voris - presenter for Best Screenplay
Tom Rainone - presenter for Best Special Makeup EFX
Johnny Legend - presenter for Worst Film
Linnea Quigley - presenter for Best Actress
Nicholas Worth - presenter for Best Actor
Darin Scott and Rusty Cundieff - presenters for Best Limited Release/Direct-to-Video Film
Joe Dante - presenter for Best Wide-Release Film
Wes Craven - presenter for Fangoria Hall of Fame Award

Winners and nominees

Awards

Fangoria Hall of Fame Award
Peter Cushing
Heather Langenkamp

External links
1995 Fangoria Chainsaw Award Winners
1995 Fangoria Chainsaw Awards IMDb

Fangoria Chainsaw Awards
Fangoria Chainsaw Awards
Fangoria Chainsaw Awards
1995 in Los Angeles
1995 in American cinema